Mogens Jespersen from Venstre was seeking a 3rd consecutive term as mayor of Mariagerfjord Municipality for this election. 

The traditional blue bloc had won 16 seats in the previous election. In the election result  Venstre would lose the position as the single largest party in the municipal council. They would instead become the joint biggest party with Social Democrats.
However, while the traditional blue bloc parties would lose 3 seats, they would also gain 3 seats, resulting in 16 blue seats again. This meant that Mogens Jespersen looked to able to continue as mayor. It was eventually confirmed.  

The constitution that would give him a 3rd term, was announced on December 10, 2021.

Electoral system
For elections to Danish municipalities, a number varying from 9 to 31 are chosen to be elected to the municipal council. The seats are then allocated using the D'Hondt method and a closed list proportional representation.
Mariagerfjord Municipality had 29 seats in 2021

Unlike in Danish General Elections, in elections to municipal councils, electoral alliances are allowed.

Electoral alliances  

Electoral Alliance 1

Electoral Alliance 2

Results

References 

Mariagerfjord